Suzanne Knoebel (December 13, 1926 – July 2, 2014) was an American internationally known cardiologist, a member of the Indiana University School of Medicine faculty, a visiting fellow at the National Institutes of Health, and the first female president of the American College of Cardiology (1982–83). She was especially known for her interests in academic research, education, and patient care.

Knoebel was affiliated with the IU School of Medicine's Krannert Institute of Cardiology, where she served as the institute's associate director (1974–90) and the medical school's assistant dean for research. Knoebel was named the Herman C. and Ellnora D. Krannert Professor of Medicine in 1977. Dr. Steven C. Beering, a former dean of the IU medical school and a former chairman of the Association of American Medical Colleges, credited Knoebel with pioneering the use of computer technology to diagnose and research heart disease.

Knoebel, a native of Fort Wayne, Indiana, earned an undergraduate degree in international relations from Goucher College in Baltimore, Maryland, in 1948, and worked for the Chamber of Commerce in Hawaii for several years before returning to Indiana. Knoebel earned a medical degree from Indiana University's School of Medicine in 1960, joined its faculty in 1964, and retired from IU in 2000. Knoebel was the recipient of numerous awards, including the Matrix Award for Indiana Woman of the Year in 1983, the IU School of Medicine's Distinguished Alumnus award in 1984, and the American College of Cardiology's Distinguished Fellowship award in 1986. The Ladies' Home Journal included Knoebel on its list of the "100 Most Important Women in America" in 1983. In addition to publishing numerous research papers on scientific and medical topics, Knoebel was the author of two children's books and two novels.

Notes

1926 births
2014 deaths
American women physicians
Indiana University faculty
American cardiologists
Women cardiologists
Fellows of the American College of Cardiology
Goucher College alumni
Indiana University School of Medicine alumni
American women academics
21st-century American women